Klinovac is a village in the municipality of Bujanovac, Serbia. According to the 2002 census, the town has a population of 539 people.

History 
Since 1880, there is Serbian Folk School functioning in Klinovac.

Population 
According to the 2002 census, 425 adult residents lived in the village of Klinovac, the average age of which was 40.7 years (39.2 years for men and 42.5 years for women). There are 163 households in the village, and the average number of members per household is 3.31.

References

Populated places in Pčinja District